Joe Dunthorne (born 1982) is a Welsh novelist, poet and journalist. He made his name with his novel Submarine (2008), made into a film in 2010. His second novel, Wild Abandon (2011), won the RSL Encore Award. A selection of his poems was published in 2010 in the Faber and Faber New Poets series. His first solo collection of poems appeared in 2019.

Early life
Joseph Oliver Dunthorne was born in Swansea, Wales in 1982. He has two sisters, Anna and Leah. Dunthorne was educated at Olchfa School, Swansea before going on to study Creative Writing at the University of East Anglia. He received BA and MA degrees in Creative Writing from UEA. In the final year of his BA course, he began writing his debut novel Submarine. During study for his MA at East Anglia, he won the university's inaugural Curtis Brown Prize for ‘’Submarine’’.

Career
Dunthorne's first novel Submarine, in which a teenager records with comedy and anguish his relationship with his girlfriend and his lop-sided view of the strains on his parents' marriage, was published by Penguin imprint Hamish Hamilton to critical acclaim in 2008. Shortly afterwards, the novel was made into a film, directed by Richard Ayoade and starring Craig Roberts, Yasmin Paige, Noah Taylor, Paddy Considine, and Sally Hawkins. The film premiered at the 35th Toronto International Film Festival, and was shown in London, Berlin and Swansea before going on general release in March 2011.

In 2010, a selection of Dunthorne's poetry was published as part of the Faber New Poets pamphlet series. Publication in the Faber New Poets series is open to poets who have yet to publish a first collection. The scheme also offers mentoring and financial support. In 2019, Dunthorne published his first collection of poetry, O Positive.

Dunthorne's second novel, Wild Abandon, was published by Penguin in 2011. An account of a brother and sister living in a rural commune, it went on to win the Royal Society of Literature's Encore Award for Best Second Novel.

Dunthorne lives in London.

Publications

Fiction
 2008: Submarine, Hamish Hamilton
 2011: Wild Abandon, Penguin
 2018: The Adulterants, Hamish Hamilton

Poetry
 2010: Faber New Poets 5, Faber and Faber
 2019: O Positive, Faber and Faber

References

External links 
 Joe Dunthorne

1982 births
Living people
21st-century Welsh novelists
21st-century Welsh poets
21st-century British male writers
21st-century Welsh writers
Date of birth missing (living people)
Alumni of the University of East Anglia
British male novelists
British male poets
People educated at Olchfa School
People from Swansea